Delwara, nestled in the Aravalli Range  hills, is a small town about 28 kms away from Udaipur, Mewar (a former state in present-day Rajasthan), and close to Eklingji Temple, on the way to the temple town of Nathdwara, in the state of Rajasthan, India. Delwara was originally known as ‘Devkul Patan Nagri’ , which means the town of god. It boasted over 1500 temples at one time, out of which there were over 400 Jain temples. Delwara was the center of learning and culture before the 15th century AD. Around the middle of the 13th century, Raja Sagar, a Deora Chauhan and a descendant of Rao Kirtipal of Jalore, was a very brave king of Delwara (Mewar). Descendants of Raja Sagar sacrificed their lives whilst fighting alongside Ranas of Mewar against Muslim invaders. Raja Sagar was the progenitor of Bachhawat and Bothra clan of Oswals. Sagar's son, Kunwar Bohitya was immensely influenced and inspired by Jain philosophy.  Samdhar, a grandson of Bohitya and a Deora Chauhan, was the first man in his genealogy to convert to Jainism.

Historical & Spiritual Background of Temple Town 
The ancient Jain temples of Delwara, now in total ruins, are believed to have been built during the reign of Samrat Samprati (224-215 BC). He was grandson of Samrat Ashoka and son of Ashoka's blind son Kunal. Samprati became the Emperor of entire western and southern part of India (Maurya Empire) and ruled from Ujjain. It is said that Samprati, also known as ‘Jain Ashoka’, built thousands of Jain temples in India. It may be noted that all the ancient Jain monuments of Rajasthan and Gujarat, including the Jain temples at Delwara (Mewar), are also attributed to Samrat Samprati.

City of learning and education 
Delwara, Nagda and Aahar (Ayad) were the centers of learning and culture before the 15th century AD. Most princes of Mewar and adjoining kingdoms were groomed in the art of warfare and formal education at Delwara. Hence it was also known as Kunwarpada – center of learning. Delwara was a large town and spread from Gandharva Sagar Lake to Nagda. Today only 25% of the original town remains.

Grandeur of Jain temples 
As of 2017, three main Jain temples remain in Delwara, for which restoration work has been undertaken. Two of the temples are of Rishabhdev (ऋषभदेव भगवान) and one of Parshvnath (पार्श्वनाथ भगवान). The Jain temples at Delwara were built with white marble stones and despite being plain and austere on the outside, the interiors of all these temples are covered with delicate carvings. Each temple has a walled courtyard called Rang Mandap. In the center of the courtyard is the shrine with the image of the deity, Rishabhdev and Parshvnath, respectively. Around the large courtyard, there are numerous small shrines, each housing a beautiful sculpture of the 24 Tirthankara (तीर्थंकर) with a series of elegantly carved pillars from the entrance to the courtyard. The special feature of these temples are their ceilings, which are circular in eleven richly carved concentric rings. The central ceiling of each temple is adorned with magnificent carvings, and it culminates into an ornamented central pendant. The pendant of the domes tapers down, forming a drop or point, like a lotus flower. This is an astonishing piece of work. It symbolises the divine grace coming down to fulfil human aspirations. The figure of sixteen goddesses of knowledge, (विध्या देवी)  are carved on the ceilings.

Why are the Jain temples at Mt. Abu called Dilwara Temples? 

There is a story that the ministers of the Solanki rulers of Gujarat visited these temples during the 11th and 13th centuries AD, and were very impressed with the architecture and carving of the temples. At the request of these visiting ministers, the then rulers of Delwara (Mewar), provided the design and drawings of the Jain temples. When Vimal Shah, minister, governor of Chandravati and commander-in-chief of Bhimadev I (1022–64), the Solanki ruler of Gujarat, came to Delwara, he was inspired by Jain Acharya to wash out his sins perpetrated in the battle fields. He hence constructed a temple near Mount Abu which was the replication of Delwara (Mewar) Jain temple.

The temple is known as Vimal Vasahi (Shri Adinath temple). He was remorseful and spent the rest of his life in religious discourse at Chandravati (near Abu road). Later, in 1230 AD, the two Porwad brothers – Vastupal and Tejpal, both ministers of the Vaghela ruler of Gujarat, came to Delwara. They also built the Jain temples designed after Vimal Vasahi temples near Abu. Since these five temples, built between the 11th and 13th century at Abu, are similar in design and architecture to the ones at Delwara (Mewar), they came to be known as Dilwara Temples (देलवाडा जैन मंदिर). These temples are a composite cluster of five temples, with their own unique identities. Each is named after the small village in which it is located. The grandeur of sculptured marble, exquisite carvings of ceilings, domes, pillars and arches of the temple, which is beyond anyone's expectations, is far superior to the originals at Delwara (Mewar).

Songara and Deora Chauhans in Mewar 
The Chauhan clan of Rajputs ruled over a large area of South Western Rajasthan and Gujarat. Alhana, younger son of Wakpati Rao Chauhan, seized Nadol (near Jodhpur) from the Paramaras and established himself there toward the end of the 10th century. His descendant, Kirtipal (Keytu) was driven from Nadol by Sultan Qutbud-din Aibak of Delhi, during the 12th century. Kirtipal then journeyed further to the south-west to Bhinmal and Sanchor, before seizing Jalore from the Paramaras. Some of his descendants were known as Sanchora Chauhans. Rao Kirtipal, the youngest son of Alhana, ruler of Nadol, is the founder of the Jalore line of Chauhans. He captured it from the Paramaras in 1181. Kirtipal was progenitor of Songara clan of Chauhans. He died in 1182 and was succeeded by his son Samar Singh.

Chauhans have 24 major sects - Hada, Songara, Deora, Khichi, Shambhri, Sanchora, Pavia, Goyalwal, Bhadauria, Malani, Nirwan, Puravia, Madrecha, Cheeba, Mohil, Chahil, Balecha, Chachera, Boda, Nadola, Nikumbh,..etc. It is said that Rao Bisaldeo was the progenitor of the Deora clan. Prithviraj Chauhan III was nephew of Rao Bisaldeo. In ages past, the rulers of Jalore, Chandravati and Sirohi belonged to the Songara and Deora clans.

It is said that around 1172–80, the King of Jalore, Rao Kirtipal (Keytu, a Songara Chauhan), captured Ahar (now Ayad), then capital of Mewar, from Rawal Samant Singh. In 1172, Rawal Samant Singh of Mewar was forced to move his capital from Ahar to Dungarpur. Samant Singh and his younger brother Kumar Singh ruled from Dungarpur. However, Ahar and the adjoining area of Mewar, was ruled by Songara / Deora Chauhans for few years, till they were recovered by Rawal Kumar Singh. Interregnum, the brothers and cousins of Songara / Deora Chauhans were perhaps given the Jagirs in the Girva – the villages surrounded by Aravalli hills of the present-day Udaipur city. Jagirdars of Girva were called Raja. There is no historical record or manuscript of Mewar / Jalore state narrating that Rawal Samant Singh was dislodged by Keytu of Jalore.  However, the extract of personal dairy written in 1939 by Mathuranath Purohit, Master of Ceremonies, Mewar, states,
Keytu Chauhan, the King of Nadol snatched Ahar from Samant Singh, after defeating him in a battle. Samant Singh went to Vagad and established Dungarpur state. Later Rawal Kumar Singh, younger brother of Rawal Samant Singh, recaptured Ahar, the capital of Mewar.

[सामंत सिंह: इन्होने गुजरात के राजा अजयपाल को परास्त किया, इस युद्ध में इतने कमजोर हो गए कि नाडोल के केय्तु चौहान ने हमला कर आहड छीन लिया तब ये बागड़ में चले गए वहां डूंगरपुर का राज्य स्थापित किया.]

[कुमार सिंह: इन्होने अपने पिता का राज्य आहड़ पीछा लिया. यह सामंत सिंह के छोटे भाई थे.]

This fact is also established by the existence of an Ashapura temple on a hill top at village Berwas, between Ahar and Debari region of Udaipur. Also, according to local dialect the village of Debari, adjacent to Berwas, means Deora-ki-Bari, meaning ‘Window to Deora Kingdom’. However, according to Mewar's eminent historian and writer, Dr Shri Krishan Jugnu, "Debari means window to God's kingdom (Dev-bari)". There is an inscription that was put up in 1975 during renovation of the Ashapura Mata temple, which says -"Temple of the Kul Deity (family idol) of Deora Chauhans was initially made by Raja Munjerao Deora of Girva in 1528" (during the times of Maharana Ratan Singh II, 1528–1531). To date the temple is managed by the Deora Chauhans.

The Udaipur Girva too has number of villages which are inhabited by the Deora Chauhans. There are many families of the Deora Chauhans in Delwara, which is very close to Udaipur and on the periphery of Girva. It is therefore quite possible that one Raja Sagar, fourth son of Rao Samant Singh of Jalore and a descendant of Rao Kirtipal, was bestowed the Jagir of Delwara during the mid-13th century. It is believed that later Maharana Udai Singh II (1540–1572), annexed these Jagirs from the Deora Chauhans to move his capital from Chittor to Udaipur when he lost Chittor to Akbar in 1568.

Eminent historian, Rai Bahadur Gaurishankar Ojha writes,
The information regarding genealogy of the Deora Chauhans, available from the different books of ‘Bhaats’ (story tellers) and inscriptions, is full of contradictions and the names are at variance. There is a difference of opinion as well, among historians regarding genealogy of Songara and the Deora Chauhans.

History of Delwara before medieval period
Bhanwarlal Nahata writes in ‘Bachhawat Muntha Vanshavli’,
Chauhans have 24 sects and Deoras are one of them. Among Deora Songira gotra, first one is Sanwantsi (Samant Singh) Songira, who had 4 sons – 1 Kalhade (Kanhadeo), 2 Malde (Maldeo), 3 Salhe (Reningdeo) and 4 Sagarsi (Sagar). Sagar's son Bohitya became sharvak (Jain disciple) by the blessings of Vardhman Suri Khartar.

Raja Sagar fought against Muslim invaders 

During the 12th century, Rao Samant Singh of Jalore had four sons – Rao Kanhadeo, Maldeo, Raningdeo and Sagar. Rao Kanhadeo and his son Kunwar Viramdeo were killed in a battle against Alauddin Khalji in 1311, while Rao Maldeo and Rao Raningdeo ruled smaller Jagirs in Jalore. It is believed that Rao Sagar was given the Jagir of Delwara, as the adjoining areas of Girva (Udaipur) were ruled by Deora Chauhans until 14-15th century.

There is another bard's tale that during the 12th century, Delwara was being ruled by a Rajput ruler Rao Bhim Singh. His only daughter was married to Rao Samant Singh of Jalore, who had two queens. Sagar was born to Delwara Baiji. Due to differences with the other queen over succession to the throne of Jalore, she returned to her father's place, Delwara. Since Rao Bhim Singh, did not have any male child, his grandson Sagar, a Deora Chauhan, ascended the throne of Delwara.

Around the middle of the 13th century, Raja Sagar, a Deora Chauhan and a descendant of Rao Kirtipal of Jalore was a very brave king of Delwara. He was the progenitor of Bothra Bachhawat clan. Raja Sagar was blessed with three sons - Bohitya, Gangadas and Jaisingh. Whenever there was invasion from Muslims, Rana Jaitra Singh (1213–53) called Raja Sagar for help in the battle. Raja Sagar always came along with army and fought valiantly against the invading Muslims.

Battle of Bhutalghati 
One of the fiercest battles Raja Sagar fought alongside Rana Jaitra Singh (1213–53) was against Sultan Shams-ud-din Iltutmish (1211–36) at Bhutalghati, near Nagda. He ensured full protection for Jaitra Singh, as Delwada's army fought fearlessly alongside Mewar army. Sultan Iltutmish destroyed many in and around Nagda and Delwara. Villages were also burnt. 
Dr Shri Krishan Jugnu, writes in his book, Nandeshma Abhilekh (Hindi) – Rajasthan Ke Prachin Abhilekh
This fierce battle was fought in the valley near Nagda towards Gogunda. Besides Gohils, there were brave soldiers from Chauhans, Chandanas, Solankis, Parmars, Chaarans and Tribals who fought for Mewar. They gave a tough fight to Sultan's army. However, when Jaitra Singh was cornered, he was secretly sheltered in one of the houses in Nagda. Iltutmish was furious and encircled Nagda. Every house was searched, burnt and destroyed. In the 14th century, according to a mythological tradition of offering water tribute to the martyrs of Bhutalghati, a lake was built at Nagda and christened as BaaghelaTaalab.” There is another bard that says that Maharana Mokal built this lake in memory of his brother Baagh Singh.

Raja Bohitya influenced by Jain philosophy 
Raja Sagar's son Raja Bohitya ruled Delwara during the time of Rawal Samar Singh (1273–1302) and Rana Ratan Singh (1302–1303). Once, apprehending danger to his life from the Muhammadans, Bohitya sought refuge in a Jain Temple at Delwara. It is believed that he was immensely influenced and inspired by Jain philosophy.

One day while Bohitya was asleep in his palace, a snake climbed the bed and bit him on his legs. After biting, the snake hit the prince with his tail and descended from the bed. Prince got up with fright and asked for help. There was commotion in the palace and Raja Sagar came to know of it. The Raja asked the prince, "What happened?" The prince replied, "Snake has bitten me". Raja tried to save him, but in vain. People looked around for the snake but couldn't find one. The prince's leg became blue and body turned cold. Knowing that the prince was dead, they took him for the final journey of cremation. At that time the disciples (bhattarack) of Acharya Jindutt Suriji who were out for ‘Gochari’ (collecting food and alms) saw the funeral procession of the prince. They started discussing among themselves. One disciple said, "The prince is not dead. Why are they taking him for cremation?"

The Mantri of Raja Sagar, who was passing by, heard the conversation and informed the King. Thus, the life of Prince Bohitya was saved and he was brought back to the palace. Since then Bohitya and his family developed deep faith in Jainism and started paying obeisance to Jain Acharyas and their disciples in Delwara. Bahrang Devi, wife of Raja Bohitya, was a beautiful and talented lady and lived in Delwara. She had eight sons - Shree Karan, Jaiso, Jaimal, Nanha, Bhima, Padam, Somji and Pushmal.

Raja Bohitya sacrifices his life for Mewar 
When Sultan Allauddin Khilji captured Chittor, Rani Padmani (wife of Rana Ratan Singh I) and several hundred other court ladies threw themselves into a fire, committing Jauhar. Khilji seized the Fort of Chittor and the fort was made over to Rao Maldeo, son of Rao Samant Singh, a Chauhan Chief in Jalore for governance. Incidentally, Rao Maldeo was the uncle of Raja Bohitya.

Both Rana Ratan Singh I and his cousin Rawal Laksh (Lakshman Singh) were killed in the battle. Raja Bohitya too sacrificed his life in the battle, while fighting alongside Rana Ratan Singh I against Allauddin Khilji in 1303. Later Maharana Hamir Singh I (1326–64), successor of Sisodia clan, married the daughter of Rao Maldeo.

Rana Shree Karan sacrifices his life for Mewar 
After Raja Bohitya, his eldest son Raja Shree Karan ascended to the throne of Delwara. Shree Karan was a kind-hearted king. Raja Shree Karan won Machindragarh (present day village Machind near Kumbhalgarh) in a battle and was bestowed the title of Rana. At one time around the mid-14th century the soldiers of Rana Shree Karan looted the treasury of Sultan Muhammad Bin Tughluk (1325–51) while his army was on a passage through Aravalli's from Delhi to Gujarat. This was one of the trade routes to sea ports of Gujarat.

Later, Chittorgarh Fort was recovered from Muslim occupation by Maharana Hamir Singh I. Sultan Muhammad Bin Tughluk of Delhi brought in large army to recapture Chittor Fort, but he was defeated by the army of Maharana Hamir Singh I and taken prisoner at Singoli, near Mandalgarh. Rana Shree Karan was killed in the battle while assisting Maharana Hamir Singh I. Muhammad Bin Tughlug was released after paying 50 lakh Rupees, 100 elephants and several districts. But he died in 1351 at Delhi. Mewar established their supremacy within 50 years of the sack of Chittorgarh and Maharana Hamir Singh I recaptured the Fort in 1353.

Deora Chauhans embrace Jainism
According to Karamchandra Vanshavali Prabandh, written in 1593 by Jaysom,
After Rana Shree Karan's death in the battle, his wife Queen Ratna Devi along with her four sons - Samdhar, Udharam, Haridas and Veerdas, went to her parents' place (pihar) at Khedinagar (Kheda, Gujarat) for their education and proficiency in the art of warfare. Samdhar, a Deora Chauhan, was the first man in his genealogy to convert to Jainism from the saint and scholar of Khartargachh, Shree Jineshwar Suri Maharaj. Thereafter his descendants became merged in the premier merchant community of Oswals and established matrimonial relations with the Jain-Oswal community. He chose Bohotra (Bothra) as the name for his clan on the name of his grandfather Bohitya. Samdhar and all his brothers became the followers of Jainism and organised sangh yatra. Thus, he received the title of Sanghpati. Samdhar was blessed by a son named Tejpal.

After the death of Bothra Samdhar, Tejpal Bothra became the Sanghpati. He gifted gold, horses, elephants, etc. to the King of Gurjar – Patan (Anhilpur) and the King pleased with his friendship gifted him some part of his region to administer. He successfully ruled the people and helped the poor and needy by providing alms. Tejpal Bothra was blessed with a son -Vilha Bothra, from his wife Tara Devi Bothra. Later on, Tejpal Bothra took santhara (fast until death - left all food) and died. After his death, Vilha Bothra became the Sanghpati. He was very rich but also very philanthropic. He gave generous donations, especially for Jain religion and honoured the sadhvis and shravaks. He had three sons - Kadua Bothra, Dharma Bothra and Nanda Bothra. After Vilha's death, his elder son Kadua Bothra became the Sanghpati and went to Chittorgarh to settle down. Later his descendant, Bothra Bachhraj became Dewan of Jodhpur and the founding Dewan of Bikaner. Bachhraj Bothra's de scendants were known as Bachhawats.

Delwara after Deora Chauhans
Later, in the 15th century, the Kingdom of Mewar was divided into 16 first grade thikanas or districts. Delwara was one of the 16 Rajwadas, along with Badi Sadri and Gogunda. Delwara has been ruled by Jhala Rajputs from the 15th century onwards. The ancestor of the Jhala family was Raj Sahib Raidharji Vogohoji of Dhrangadhara (Halvad), son of Harpal Makwana. During the reign of Maharana Raimal (1473–1509), Ajoji (Ajja Singh Jhala) the deposed son of Raj Sahib Raidharji, along with his brother Sajoji (Sajja Singh Jhala) came to Mewar. Jhalas performed meritorious service in Mewar. Later the Maharana granted the Jagir of Delwara to Kunwar Sajja and that of Bari Sadri to Kunwar Ajja Singh and were granted the title of Raj Rana.

Ajja fought alongside Maharana Sangram Singh I (1509–1527) against Babur in 1527 at the Battle of Khanwa. When Maharana Sangram Singh (Rana Sanga) was wounded on the battlefield, Ajja donned the Maharana's tunic, which kept the Mewar army together but proved fatal for Raj Rana Ajja, who died in the battle. As many as 7 generations of the Jhala family had been sacrificing their lives for the Maharanas of Mewar.

Who ruled Delwara after Deora Chauhans left in the 14th century till Jhalas came in the 15th century? There is an inscription plate of 1975, that Ashapura Temple at Berwas (near Debari) was built by Raja Munjerao Deora of Girva in 1528. Who were the ancestors of Munjerao? Were they descendants of Raja Sagar? It is yet to be researched and established.

Delightful places 
Devi Garh Palace - This 18th century palace in the village of Delwara has undergone years of restoration and rebuilding. This all-suite luxury hotel with 39 suites takes on the look of modern India, with an emphasis on design and detail, using local marble and semi-precious stones. The contemporary design showcased within this spectacular heritage property, complemented by personalized and intimate service, creates a new image of India for the 21st century.

Rishabhdev Jain Temple - This 700+ year-old white marble temple showcases 149 pillars and contains 52 individual shrines. This temple provides an outstanding example of the fine craftsmanship and architecture of its era. The inner chambers and columns are covered in exquisite marble carvings and stone work.

Parshwanath Jain Temple - This 900+ year-old temple's architecture and sculptures reveal the work of great artisans and craftsmen. A unique feature of the temple is a chamber about 5 meters underground, which houses 13 beautiful idols. Over the past few years, the Jain community has initiated a large scale project to restore this temple to its former state.

Sadhna Workshop - About 20 years ago, a patchwork program was initiated in Delwara by a local NGO, Seva Mandir, as an income generation activity to promote women's empowerment. Today, this initiative has transformed into a self-owned enterprise involving more than 600 women from various villages. Of these, around 250 are from Delwara, which is where their main workshop is found. Open to the public, fair trade and high quality women's clothing can be purchased here.

Hunting Tower - According to a book published by the Adeshvar Jain Temple, this hunting tower located on Kantya hill, locally known as Audhi, was built by King Jasvantsinh. It was used by the king for hunting during his rule.

Palera Talab - A large lake standing at the entrance to Delwara, which was built around 1875 AD. Two small domed pavilions ornamented the lake, adding to its charm. The name Palera Talab is derived from Sanskrit 'palankarta', which means ‘protector’ – an appropriate name given to the lake that is the town's main water source.

Indra Kund - A beautiful step well that is a marvellous example of stone carvings and is about 15 meters deep.

References

Further reading 

 
 
 
 
 
 

Mewar
Cities and towns in Rajsamand district